Manuel Mota Cerrillo (9 July 1966 ‒ 8 January 2013) was a Spanish dress designer and creative director of Spanish fashion company, Pronovias, for 23 years.

Mota was born in Reus, Tarragona, Spain. He created dresses for some of the world's top models including Miranda Kerr from Australia, Bar Refaeli from Israel, and Doutzen Kroes from the Netherlands.

On 8 January 2013 Mota was found dead at his home in Sitges, Barcelona, Spain. He was 46. Various press reports have listed the cause of death as suicide, though the official cause has yet to be confirmed by Spanish authorities.

References

External links
Ella Alexander, "Pronovias Creative Director Manuel Mota Dies", Vogue UK (January 9, 2013)

1966 births
2013 suicides
Spanish fashion designers
Deaths by stabbing
Deaths by stabbing in Spain
Suicides in Spain
LGBT fashion designers
LGBT-related suicides